Dactylagnus parvus, the Panamic stargazer, is a species of sand stargazer found along the Pacific coast of southern Baja California to Panama where it can be found down to a depth of about .  It can reach a maximum length of  SL.

References

parvus
Fish described in 1976
Taxa named by Charles Eric Dawson